Tertiapatoidea is an extinct superfamily of onychophorans consisting of two monospecific families, Tertiapatidae, and Succinipatopsidae, neither of which preserve feet or claws at the ends of their legs.

References

Onychophoran superfamilies
Prehistoric onychophorans
Prehistoric animal superfamilies